Oliver Hogue (29 April 1880 – 3 March 1919) was an Australian soldier, journalist, and poet.

Family
The second son of James Alexander Hogue (1846-1920), and Jessie Hogue (1853-1932), née Robards, Oliver Hogue (one of twins), was born at Darlington, New South Wales on 29 April 1880.

He had five brothers and four sisters.

Two of his brothers also served in the First AIF: Lieutenant Stephen James Hogue (1889-1978), Australian Army Medical Corps (A.A.M.C.), and Private Frank Arthur Hogue (1885-1949). Another brother, John Roland Hogue (1882-1958), was a talented professional singer (baritone), Broadway, film, and U.S. television actor, and playwright. One of his sisters, Anne Christina Hogue (1892-1964), was Tien Hogue, the Australian actress of stage and the silent screen, who later married Vice-Admiral Sir Arthur Guy Norris Wyatt, K.B., C.B..

Early life
Hogue attended Forest Lodge Public School in Sydney, and was active in shooting and equestrianism. In his youth, Hogue was also an avid cyclist who logged thousands of miles cycling across the country's eastern and northern coasts.

Journalism
In July 1907, Hogue joined the Sydney Morning Herald as a junior reporter.

Military service
In September 1914, he enlisted in the Australian Imperial Force as a trooper with the 6th Light Horse Regiment. He became a second lieutenant in November 1914, shortly after which he and the 2nd Light Horse Brigade were posted to Egypt. Hogue fought the Battle of Gallipoli but was sent to England midway after contracting typhoid fever. In May 1915, he was promoted to lieutenant and appointed as an orderly officer to brigade commander Colonel Granville Ryrie.

"Trooper Bluegum"

Hogue sent articles under the pen-name "Trooper Bluegum" to the Sydney Morning Herald, which he later compiled and had published as Love Letters of an Anzac (London, 1916) and Trooper Bluegum at the Dardanelles (London, 1916).

The single work of "Trooper Bluegum" that remains popular today is his (1919) poem, "The Horses Stay Behind". The poem describes the feeling of each of the men of the Light Horse for their horse, and their distress at having learned that, due to quarantine regulations, their horse was not going to return to Australia ("many … of the men of the Light Horse … had planned to buy their horse from the army [and] dreamt of the good times they and their beloved walers could enjoy back home"). Instead, their horse would either be shot (with its shoes, and mane and tail cut off, because "iron and horsehair were salable") and, after having been shot, would be skinned and its hide sold for leather, or would it be sold locally — and would, no doubt, be very "cruelly treated".

Death
Having survived the war, he was admitted to the 3rd General Hospital in London, on 27 February 1919, "dangerously ill" during the influenza epidemic of 1919. His brother Stephen was at his bedside when he died of influenza, five days later, on 3 March 1919.

Burial
Major Oliver Hogue was buried, with full military honours, at the Brookwood Military Cemetery in Brookwood, Surrey, England.

Commemorated
Hogue Place, in the Canberra suburb of Gilmore, is named in his and his father James Hogue's honour.

Works
Aside from his numerous newspaper articles as both civilian and soldier, he wrote four books:
 Hogue, Oliver (Trooper Bluegum), Love Letters of an Anzac, Andrew Melrose Ltd., (London) 1916.
 Hogue, Oliver, Trooper Bluegum at the Dardanelles".Trooper Bluegum at the Dardanelles: Descriptive Narratives of the More Desperate Engagements on the Gallipoli Peninsula (Second Edition),  Andrew Melrose Ltd., (London) 1916.
 Hogue, Oliver, The Home-Sick Anzac and Other War Verses, pp.37-58 in Poems and Pictures for the Red Cross Society, Australian Red Cross Society, (North Sydney), 1918.
 Hogue, Oliver (Trooper Bluegum), The Cameliers, Andrew Melrose Ltd., (London) 1919.

Footnotes

References

 Gullett, H.S., and Barrett, C. (eds.), Australia in Palestine, Angus & Robertson Ltd., (Sydney), 1919.
 First World War Embarkation Roll: Second Lieutenant Oliver Hogue, collection of the Australian War Memorial.
 First World War Nominal Roll: Major Oliver Hogue, collection of the Australian War Memorial.
 First World War Service Record: Major Oliver Hogue, collection of the National Archives of Australia.
 462nd Casualty List: New South Wales: Died, Other Causes, The Sydney Morning Herald,  (Tuesday, 1 April 1919), p.8.
 "Trooper Bluegum": Death of Major Oliver Hogue from Influenza in London, The (Sydney) Sun, (Tuesday, 11 March 1919), p.8.
 Trooper Bluegum: Oliver Hogue Dead: Victim of Influenza, The Sydney Morning Herald, (Wednesday, 12 March 1919), p.10.
 W.F.W. (William Farmer Whyte), "Trooper Bluegum Goes West", The (Brisbane) Daily Mail, (Saturday, 15 March 1919), p.13.
 Roll of Honour: Major Oliver Hogue, Australian War Memorial.
 Photograph of the Funeral Procession before the Burial of Major Oliver Hogue ("Trooper Bluegum"), 14th Australian Light Horse Regiment, on the day of his Burial in London (8 March 1919), collection of the Australian War Memorial (Accession number P01588.012.
 Photograph of the Australian Troops taking part in the Burial Ceremony for Major Oliver Hogue ("Trooper Bluegum"), 14th Australian Light Horse Regiment, on the day of his Burial in London (8 March 1919), collection of the Australian War Memorial (Accession number P01588.014.
 Photograph of the Grave of Major Oliver Hogue ("Trooper Bluegum"), 14th Australian Light Horse Regiment, on the Day of his Burial in London (8 March 1919), collection of the Australian War Memorial (Accession number P01588.013.
 Major Oliver Hogue, 14th Australian Light Horse, Commonwealth War Graves Commission.
 Classroom Resources: Case Studies: Oliver "Trooper Bluegum" Hogue, Australian War Memorial.
 John Fairfax and Sons, Record of Service: Members of the Staff of the Sydney Morning Herald and the Sydney Mail who served in the Great War, John Fairfax and Sons Limited, (Sydney), 1919.
 Elyne Mitchell,  "Hogue, Oliver (1880–1919)", in eds. B. Nairn & G. Serle, Australian Dictionary of Biography, Volume 9: 1891—1929: Gil-Las, Melbourne University Press, (Carlton) 1983.

External links
Papers of Oliver Hogue at State Library of New South Wales
Oliver Hogue at AustLit

1880 births
1919 deaths
Australian Army officers
20th-century Australian male writers
20th-century Australian journalists
Australian military personnel of World War I
Deaths from Spanish flu
The Sydney Morning Herald people